Lavalys is  a Canadian software development company founded in 2003 that specialized in computer diagnostics and system profiling software popular amongst computer enthusiasts.

Products
Lavalys' EVEREST software suite is used for computer diagnostics, system profiling, benchmark, overclocking, network audit and troubleshooting. Separate editions existed for both home and professional use.

In November 2010, the Hungarian software company FinalWire acquired and subsequently discontinued the EVEREST product line in favor of AIDA64, the company's existing product.

References

Software companies of Canada
Companies based in Montreal